This is a list of notable persons who were born in and/or have lived in the American city of Monroe, Louisiana.

For a list of people who have studied at the University of Louisiana at Monroe, see List of University of Louisiana at Monroe alumni.

Actors and entertainers
 Clay Jordan, contestant on Survivor Thailand
 Valerie Mason, September 2008 Playboy Playmate
 Mighty Sam McClain, soul blues singer and songwriter
 Mantan Moreland, actor and comic of the 1930s and 1940s
 Jesse Pearson, actor and screenwriter; died in Monroe in 1979
 Parker Posey, film actress
 Monti Sharp, film and soap opera actor
 Susan Ward, film and soap opera actress

Businesspeople
 Samuel B. Fuller (1905-1988), entrepreneur and journalist, founder of Fuller Products Company
 Collett E. Woolman (1889-1966), an original director and founder of Delta Air Service

Journalists
 Frank McGee, television journalist

Musicians
Fred Anderson, jazz saxophonist and club owner
Hamid Drake, jazz drummer and percussionist
Doug Duffey, singer, songwriter, pianist, bandleader, music arranger, record producer, music publisher, poet, diarist, photographer and visual artist
Carl Fontana, jazz trombonist
Kevin Griffin, lead singer of Better Than Ezra
Andy Griggs, country music singer
Ivory Joe Hunter, rhythm and blues musician
Rickey Minor, music director, composer, music producer, and music director and bandleader for The Tonight Show with Jay Leno
Webb Pierce, country musician
Frank Ticheli, composer, conductor, Professor of Music at University of Southern California

Politicians
 Edwards Barham, former member of the Louisiana State Senate from Morehouse Parish
 William Denis Brown III (1931–2012), attorney, businessman, and state senator, floor leader in first term of Governor Edwin Washington Edwards
 William Derwood Cann Jr. (1919–2010), World War II lieutenant colonel; interim mayor of Monroe 1978–1979 
 Donnie Copeland (born 1961), Pentecostal pastor in North Little Rock, Arkansas, and Republican member of the Arkansas House of Representatives, 2015 to 2017, born in Monroe
 James L. Dennis (born 1936), Judge of the United States Court of Appeals for the Fifth Circuit
 Jimmy Dimos, former Speaker of the Louisiana House of Representatives and retired judge
 William C. Feazel (1895–1965), interim U.S. Senator in 1948; member of the Louisiana House of Representatives 1932–1936; father-in-law of Shady R. Wall
 W. L. "Jack" Howard (1911–1994), former mayor of Monroe and owner with his brother, Alton Hardy Howard of the former Howard Brothers Discount Stores
 Marcus Hunter (born 1979), member of the Louisiana House of Representatives from District 17 in Ouachita Parish
 Vance McAllister, businessman and U.S. representative elected in Louisiana's 5th congressional district special election, 2013
 Newt V. Mills, U.S. representative from Louisiana's 5th congressional district 1937–1943; resided in Monroe
 Jay Morris, state representative from Ouachita and Morehouse parishes, 2012–
 Huey P. Newton (1942-1989) co-founder of the Black Panther Party, born in Monroe.
 James A. Noe, short-term governor of Louisiana in 1936; founder of WNOE and KNOE radio and TV stations
 Abe E. Pierce III (1934–2021), mayor of Monroe 1996–2000, first African American in the position; Ouachita Parish educator
 Robert E. Powell (1923–1997), mayor of Monroe 1979–1996
 Melvin Rambin (1941–2001), mayor of Monroe 2000–2001, only Republican in the position since Reconstruction; banker in Baton Rouge and Monroe; interred in Baton Rouge
 Frank Spooner, oil and natural gas producer and Republican politician, moved to Monroe in 1967
 Jeff R. Thompson, former insurance agent in Monroe; state representative from Bossier Parish; incoming 26th Judicial District Court judge
 J. Robert Wooley (born 1953), Louisiana Commissioner of Insurance, 2000–2006; spent his high school and college years in Monroe

Athletes
Brian Bateman, PGA golfer, 2007 Buick Open winner
Benoit Benjamin, NBA center for the Cleveland Cavaliers
Bubby Brister, Denver Broncos quarterback
Ronnie Coleman, retired professional bodybuilder; former middle linebacker Grambling State University
John David Crow, late coach of the ULM Warhawks; professional football player
LaceDarius Dunn, basketball guard with Bnei HaSharon in Israel
Billy Joe DuPree, tight end for the Dallas Cowboys
Chuck Finley, MLB All-Star pitcher, California Angels, Cleveland Indians and St. Louis Cardinals; ex-spouse of Tawny Kitaen
Ralph Garr, All-Star MLB outfielder
Larry Gordon, football player
James Harris, NFL quarterback
Gerrod Henderson, basketball player for the Anwil Włocławek 2007–09
Tyree Hollins, football player
Cardia Jackson, Louisiana–Monroe Warhawk and Green Bay Packers linebacker
Bradie James, LSU and Dallas Cowboys linebacker
Shawn King, ULM/LSU and Carolina Panthers defensive end
Lynn McGlothen, MLB pitcher
Paul Millsap, power forward for Louisiana Tech University and the Atlanta Hawks
Rudy Niswanger, LSU and Kansas City Chiefs center
Joe Profit, Atlanta Falcons and New Orleans Saints running back
Cassidy O'Reilly, professional wrestler, WWE TNA
Phil Robertson, quarterback for Louisiana Tech Bulldogs
Johnny Robinson, LSU and Kansas City Chiefs safety
Barry Rubin (born 1957), Head Strength and Conditioning Coach of the Kansas City Chiefs in the National Football League
Bill Russell, NBA center for the Boston Celtics), Basketball Hall of Famer
Cam Sims, Alabama and wide receiver for Washington Football Team
Ben Sheets, MLB All-Star Milwaukee Brewers, Oakland Athletics and Atlanta Braves pitcher; played at NLU, now ULM
Sammy White, football player, GSU and Offensive Rookie of Year receiver for Minnesota Vikings
Andrew Whitworth, LSU and Cincinnati Bengals offensive tackle
Jonathan Wilhite, Auburn and New England Patriots cornerback
Aeneas Williams, St. Louis Rams free safety
Pat Williams, NFL defensive tackle for the Buffalo Bills and Minnesota Vikings
 Ralph Williams, gridiron football player
 Don Wilson, MLB pitcher for the Houston Astros
Larry Wright, GSU and NBA guard for the Washington Bullets

Writers
 Harry W. Addison, writer and humorist
 Dixon Hearne, writer and poet
 Speed Lamkin, novelist and playwright

Others
 Guy Banister, career employee of the FBI and private investigator; alleged co-conspirator in assassination of John F. Kennedy
 James E. Cofer, president of the University of Louisiana at Monroe 2002–2010 
 Bruce M. Davis, Manson family member serving life sentence  for murder
 Robert Pershing Foster, MD, a subject of Isabel Wilkerson's book The Warmth of Other Suns
 W. C. Friley, Baptist clergyman; second president of Louisiana College; pastor in Monroe in the early 1880s
 Hugh H. Goodwin, Vice admiral in the United States Navy
 Marguerite Littman, American-British socialite and HIV/AIDS activist
 Rowena Spencer, MD; first female pediatric surgeon
 Marc Swayze, comic book writer and illustrator
 Emily H. Vokes, malacologist and Tulane University professor

See also

References

Monroe, Louisiana
Monroe